Katia Pietrosanti (born 22 June 1979, Como) is an Italian rhythmic gymnast. She is the 1993 European Junior silver medalist in clubs.

Pietrosanti competed for Italy in the rhythmic gymnastics individual all-around competition at the 1996 Summer Olympics in Atlanta. There she was 20th in the qualification round and advanced to the semifinal. In the semifinal she was 14th and did not advance to the final of 10 competitors.

References

External links 
 
 

1979 births
Living people
Italian rhythmic gymnasts
Gymnasts at the 1996 Summer Olympics
Olympic gymnasts of Italy
Sportspeople from Como
20th-century Italian women